Maud Howe Elliott (November 9, 1854 – March 19, 1948) was an American novelist, most notable for her Pulitzer prize-winning collaboration with her sisters, Laura E. Richards and Florence Hall, on their mother's biography The Life of Julia Ward Howe (1916). Her other works included A Newport Aquarelle (1883); Phillida (1891); Mammon, later published as Honor: A Novel (1893); Roma Beata, Letters from the Eternal City (1903); The Eleventh Hour in the Life of Julia Ward Howe (1911); Three Generations (1923); Lord Byron's Helmet (1927); John Elliott, The Story of an Artist (1930); My Cousin, F. Marion Crawford (1934); and This Was My Newport (1944).


Biography
Maud Howe was born on November 9, 1854, at the Perkins School for the Blind in Boston, founded by her father, Samuel Gridley Howe. Her mother was the author and abolitionist Julia Ward Howe. In 1887, she married English artist John Elliott. A socialite, Elliott was one of the founding members of the Society of the Four Arts in Palm Beach, Florida  She was the honorary president of the organization until her death.

After her marriage, she lived in Chicago (1892–93) and Italy (1894-1900/1906-1910), before moving to Newport, where she spent the rest of her life. She was a founding member of the Newport Art Association, and served as its secretary from 1912 to 1942. Howe was also a founder of the Progressive Party and took part in the suffrage movement.

She died in 1948 in Newport, Rhode Island.

References

Bibliography
 Boyer, Paul S.  "Howe, Julia Ward" in  Notable American Women 1607–1950. Cambridge, MA: The Belknap Press of Harvard University Press, 1971. 2:225-229. 
 Grinnell, Nancy Whipple, Carrying the Torch. Maud Howe Elliott and the American Renaissance. University Press of New England, 2014.
 Elliott, Maud Howe, Three Generations. Boston, Little, Brown, and Co. 1923. (Full text available in the Internet Archive)

External links

 
 
 Maud Howe Elliott. Rhode Island Heritage Hall of Fame web page. 2014-05-21. 
 Maud Howe Elliott Papers, 1882-1948 Finding Aid, John Hay Library, Brown University. 2014-05-21. The collection includes unpublished manuscripts for Elliott's memoirs "Afternoon Tea" and "Memories of Eighty Years."

1854 births
1948 deaths
Writers from Boston
Pulitzer Prize for Biography or Autobiography winners
American suffragists
American women non-fiction writers
Women autobiographers